, the Association of Southeast Asian Nations (ASEAN) has 10 member states, one candidate member state, and one observer state.

ASEAN was founded on 8 August 1967 with five members: Indonesia, Malaysia, the Philippines, Singapore, and Thailand. It is headquartered in Jakarta.

Lists
A list of member states is provided below. The members of ASEAN Plus Three and the East Asia Summit are also listed.  Both forums are ASEAN-led and meetings are held following the ASEAN Summit.

Also listed are participants of the ASEAN Regional Forum (ARF), an organisation throughout the Asia-Pacific region whose objectives are to foster dialogue and consultation, and promote confidence-building and preventive diplomacy in the region.

The ASEAN is an organisation on the Southeast Asian region that aims to accelerate economic growth, social progress, and cultural development among its members and to promote regional peace.

ASEAN member states

Non-member states

ASEAN candidate/observer states

ASEAN Plus Three Nation States

The present members of ASEAN together with:

East Asia Summit 

The present members of ASEAN Plus Three together with:

ASEAN Regional Forum
The ASEAN Regional Forum is an informal multilateral dialogue of 28 members that seeks to address security issues in the Asia-Pacific region.

The list includes the members of the East Asia Summit plus:

References

External links
 ASEAN Secretariat

 
Southeast Asian Nations
Association of Southeast Asian Nations